The 70th World Science Fiction Convention (Worldcon), also known as Chicon 7, was held on 30 August–3 September 2012 at the Hyatt Regency Chicago in Chicago, Illinois, United States.

The convention committee was chaired by Dave McCarty and organized under the auspices of the Chicago Worldcon Bid corporation.

Participants 

Attendance was 4,628.

Guests of Honor 

 author Mike Resnick
 artist Rowena Morrill (absent due to illness)
 astronaut Story Musgrave
 fan Peggy Rae Sapienza
 agent guest Jane Frank
 Sy Liebergot (Special Guest)
 John Scalzi (toastmaster)

Awards

2012 Hugo Awards 

The results were based on the 1,922 ballots submitted by members of the World Science Fiction Society. This was the second-highest total number of ballots ever cast for the Hugo. The unique base design for this year's Hugo Award trophies was designed by Deb Kosiba, designer of the trophy bases for both the 2005 and 2006 Hugo Awards. This was the first year for the new Best Fancast category, separating podcasts from more traditional fanzines.

 Best Novel: Among Others by Jo Walton (Tor Books)
 Best Novella: "The Man Who Bridged the Mist" by Kij Johnson (September/October 2011 Asimov's)
 Best Novelette: "Six Months, Three Days" by Charlie Jane Anders (Tor.com)
 Best Short Story: "The Paper Menagerie" by Ken Liu (March/April 2011 Fantasy & Science Fiction)
 Best Related Work: The Encyclopedia of Science Fiction, Third Edition by John Clute, David Langford, Peter Nicholls, and Graham Sleight (Victor Gollancz Ltd)
 Best Graphic Story: Digger, Ursula Vernon (writer, artist) (Sofawolf Press)
 Best Dramatic Presentation, Long Form: Game of Thrones (Season One), David Benioff (creator) D. B. Weiss (creator), multiple directors and writers (HBO)
 Best Dramatic Presentation, Short Form: Doctor Who, "The Doctor's Wife", screenplay by Neil Gaiman, directed by Richard Clark (BBC Cymru Wales)
 Best Professional Editor, Long Form: Betsy Wollheim (DAW Books)
 Best Professional Editor, Short Form: Sheila Williams (Asimov's Science Fiction)
 Best Professional Artist: John Picacio
 Best Semiprozine: Locus, edited by Liza Groen Trombi and Kirsten Gong-Wong
 Best Fanzine: SF Signal, edited by John DeNardo
 Best Fancast: SF Squeecast, by Lynne M. Thomas, Seanan McGuire, Paul Cornell, Elizabeth Bear, and Catherynne M. Valente
 Best Fan Writer: Jim C. Hines
 Best Fan Artist: Maurine Starkey

The Hugo Awards ceremony was intended to be webcast live via Ustream, but automatic routines on the site mistook brief film clips from the dramatic presentation categories as copyright infringement, even though they had been provided by NBC and the BBC. The stream was terminated in the middle of Neil Gaiman's acceptance speech and Worldcon temporarily banned as a user on the site.

Other awards 

Special awards presentations at Chicon 7 included the Chesley Awards for artistic excellence.

 Big Heart Award: Juanita Coulson
 Special Committee Award: Robert Weinberg
 John W. Campbell Award for Best New Writer: E. Lily Yu

Site selection

The bid 

The "Chicago in 2012" bid committee issued a series of ten short magazines, called bidzines, each featuring a story by a different Chicago-related author, such as Frederik Pohl, Jody Lynn Nye, Phyllis Eisenstein, and Mike Resnick. Each story was approximately 2,000 words and additional stories by other Chicago authors, including Richard Garfinkle and Lois Tilton, were published on the bid's website. "Cover" art was provided by noted artists such as Kaja Foglio and Frank Wu.

The bid also did not sell supporting memberships as most Worldcon bids do, instead asking supporters to simply make a donation to help the bid. Supporters who donated at least $100 and voted in site selection automatically had their support converted to an attending membership.

Voting 

Chicago's bid to host the Worldcon was formally unopposed and won in balloting among the members of the 68th World Science Fiction Convention held in Melbourne, Australia, in 2010. With only 526 ballots cast, this election had the lowest turnout since voting records began to be kept in 1974. The voting breakdown was 447 votes for Chicago, 20 ballots expressed no preference, and there were 59 write-in votes for various sites.

Future site selection 

Chicon 7 members overwhelmingly selected the formally unopposed "London in 2014" bid to host the 72nd World Science Fiction Convention in August 2014.

See also 

 Hugo Award
 Science fiction
 Speculative fiction
 World Science Fiction Society
 Worldcon

References

External links 

 Chicon 7 official website
 Worldcon official website

2012 conferences
2012 in Illinois
2012 in the United States
Culture of Chicago
Science fiction conventions in the United States
Worldcon